The 4 x 100 metre relay at the 2005 World Championships in Athletics was held at the Helsinki Olympic Stadium on August 13 and August 14.

Medals

Qualifying
From the initial two heats the first three teams in each plus two fastest losers progressed through to the final.

All times shown are in seconds.
Q denotes automatic qualification.
q denotes fastest losers.
DNS denotes did not start.
DNF denotes did not finish.
AR denotes area record.
NR denotes national record.
PB denotes personal best.
SB denotes season's best.

Heats

Heat 1
 United States (Angela Daigle, Muna Lee, Me'Lisa Barber, Lauryn Williams) 42.16s Q (WL)
 Nigeria (Gloria Kemasuode, Endurance Ojokolo, Oludamola Osayomi, Mercy Nku) 43.53s Q (SB)
 Sweden (Emma Rienas, Carolina Klüft, Jenny Kallur, Susanna Kallur) 43.67s (NR)
 Great Britain (Emily Freeman, Emma Ania, Laura Turner, Katherine Endacott) 43.83 (SB)
 Netherlands (Pascal van Assendelft, Jacqueline Poelman, Annemarie Kramer, Judith Baarssen) DQ
 Bahamas (Tamicka Clarke, Chandra Sturrup, Savatheda Fynes, Philippa Arnett-Willie) DNF

Heat 2
 France (Patricia Buval, Lina Jacques-Sébastien, Fabe Dia, Christine Arron) 42.86 Q (SB)
 Jamaica (Daniele Browning, Sherone Simpson, Beverly McDonald, Aleen Bailey) 42.97s Q (SB)
 Colombia (Melisa Murillo, Felipa Palacios, Darlenis Obregón, Norma Gonzalez) 43.03s q (NR)
 Brazil (Raquel Martins da Costa, Lucimar Aparecida de Moura, Thatiana Regina Ignâcio, Luciana Alves dos Santos) 43.22s q (SB)
 Italy (Elena Sordelli, Vincenza Calì, Manuela Grillo, Maria Aurora Salvagno) 44.03s
 Finland (Ilona Ranta, Katja Salivaara, Sari Keskitalo, Heidi Hannula) DNF

Heat 3
 Belarus (Yulia Nesterenko, Natalya Sologub, Alena Nevmerzhitskaya, Oksana Dragun) 42.80s Q (NR)
 Poland (Iwona Dorobisz, Daria Onyśko, Dorota Dydo, Iwona Brzezińska) 43.37s Q (SB)
 Belgium (Katleen De Caluwé, Nancy Callaerts, Élodie Ouédraogo, Kim Gevaert) 43.40s (SB)
 Ukraine (Iryna Kozhemyakina, Iryna Shepetyuk, Iryna Shtanhyeyeva, Olena Pastushenko-Sinyavina) 43.62s (SB)
 Japan (Tomoko Ishida, Ayumi Suzuki, Yuka Sato, Sakie Nobuoka) 44.52s (SB)
 Russia (Yekaterina Kondratyeva, Yuliya Gushchina, Irina Khabarova, Larisa Kruglova) DNF

Final
 United States (Angela Daigle, Muna Lee, Me'Lisa Barber, Lauryn Williams) 41.78s (WL)
 Jamaica (Daniele Browning, Sherone Simpson, Aleen Bailey, Veronica Campbell) 41.99s (SB)
 Belarus (Yulia Nesterenko, Natalya Sologub, Alena Nevmerzhitskaya, Oksana Dragun) 42.56s (NR)
 France (Patricia Buval, Lina Jacques-Sébastien, Fabe Dia, Christine Arron) 42.85 (SB)
 Brazil (Raquel Martins da Costa, Lucimar Aparecida de Moura, Thatiana Regina Ignâcio, Luciana Alves dos Santos) 42.99s (SB)
 Colombia (Melisa Murillo, Felipa Palacios, Darlenis Obregón, Norma Gonzalez) 43.07s
 Nigeria (Gloria Kemasuode, Endurance Ojokolo, Oludamola Osayomi, Mercy Nku) 43.25s (SB)
 Poland (Iwona Dorobisz, Daria Onyśko, Dorota Dydo, Iwona Brzezińska) 43.49s

External links
IAAF results, heats
IAAF results, final

Relay
Relays at the World Athletics Championships
4 × 100 metres relay
2005 in women's athletics